Rob Leone is a former politician in Ontario, Canada. He was a Progressive Conservative member of the Legislative Assembly of Ontario from 2011 to 2014. He represented the riding of Cambridge.

Background
Leone holds a Ph.D from McMaster University. As of 2015, he teaches at University of Western Ontario as a political science professor with a focus on Canadian politics. Leone has also been a contributor for The Hub  since May 2021.

Politics
Leone ran in the 2011 provincial election as the Progressive Conservative candidate in the riding of Cambridge. He defeated Liberal candidate Kathryn McGarry by 1,954 votes. He faced McGarry again in 2014 and this time was defeated by McGarry by 3,067 votes.

During his time in the legislature, he was the PC party's critic for training and education issues.

References

External links

Living people
People from Cambridge, Ontario
Progressive Conservative Party of Ontario MPPs
McMaster University alumni
Academic staff of the University of Western Ontario
21st-century Canadian politicians
Year of birth missing (living people)